Mucha is a genus of flies in the family Sepsidae.

Species
Mucha liangi Li & Yang, 2014
Mucha plumosa Ozerov, 2012
Mucha rectotibialis Iwasa, 2012
Mucha tzokotucha Ozerov, 1992
Mucha yunnanensis Li & Yang, 2014

References

Sepsidae
Diptera of Asia
Brachycera genera